Franklin Island Light is a lighthouse on Franklin Island, in Muscongus Bay, Maine, USA.
It was first established in 1805. The present structure was built in 1855.

References

Towers completed in 1805
Lighthouses completed in 1855
Lighthouses in Knox County, Maine
1805 establishments in Massachusetts